Hibbertia inclusa is a species of flowering plant in the family Dilleniaceae and is endemic to the south-west of Western Australia. It was first formally described in 1863 by George Bentham in Flora Australiensis from specimens collected from the Swan River Colony by James Drummond. The specific epithet (inclusa) means "enclosed", referring to the flowers being enclosed in floral bracts.

Hibbertia inclusa grows in claypans, floodplains, ridges and dunes in the Avon Wheatbelt, Coolgardie, Esperance Plains, Jarrah Forest, Mallee, Swan Coastal Plain and Warren biogeographic regions of south-western Western Australia. It is classified as "not threatened" by the Western Australian Government Department of Parks and Wildlife.

See also
List of Hibbertia species

References

inclusa
Flora of Western Australia
Plants described in 1863
Taxa named by George Bentham